The Iceman Cometh is a 1973 American drama film directed by John Frankenheimer.  The screenplay, written by Thomas Quinn Curtiss, is based on Eugene O'Neill's 1946 play of the same name. The film was produced by Ely Landau for the American Film Theatre, which from 1973 to 1975 presented thirteen film adaptations of noted plays.

The film was screened at the 1976 Cannes Film Festival, but it wasn't entered into the main competition.

The film, 3 hours 59 minutes in length, had two intermissions.

This was the last film for both Robert Ryan and Fredric March. March developed prostate cancer in 1970, causing him to retire from acting. Ryan died before the film's release.

Plot

Cast
Lee Marvin as Theodore "Hickey" Hickman
Fredric March as Harry Hope
Robert Ryan as Larry Slade
Jeff Bridges as Don Parritt
Bradford Dillman as Willie Oban
Sorrell Booke as Hugo Kalmar
Hildy Brooks as Margie
Juno Dawson (as Nancy Juno Dawson) as Pearl
Evans Evans as Cora
Martyn Green as Cecil Lewis
Moses Gunn as Joe Mott
Clifton James as Pat McGloin
John McLiam as Jimmy Tomorrow
Stephen Pearlman as Chuck Morelo
Tom Pedi as Rocky Pioggi
George Voskovec as Piet Wetjoen

Production
Director John Frankenheimer later said:
We found the most difficult thing was to cut it. We cut 1 hour and 20 minutes out of the original, but by the time we'd finished it we'd put back in an hour. It was a marvelous movie – up til now (1974) my best experience. We were like a repertory company; we never wanted it to end. I tried to show Hickey as sane and not the way I've seen him interpreted, as insane. I think you have to live your life without illusions, not with them. Pauline Kael said in her review that you only have to look at photos of O'Neill to see this was a face with no illusions.

Reception
Roger Ebert gave the film his highest possible grade of four stars and wrote: "The play was clearly too difficult to be done as an ordinary commercial movie, but now it has been preserved, with a series of brilliant performances and a virtuoso directing achievement, in what has to be a definitive film version." Ebert ranked The Iceman Cometh fifth on his year-end list of the best films of 1973.

Vincent Canby of The New York Times wrote in a less enthusiastic review that while watching the film "you get the feeling that you're being taken on a guided tour of one of the greatest American plays ever written, instead of seeing a screen adaptation with a life of its own."

Variety declared: "The excellence of the cast alone, and the fame of the work and its author make this filmed stage play worth the ticket ... It requires stamina, of course, to sit through four hours, but the experience is very special."

Gene Siskel of the Chicago Tribune awarded three-and-a-half stars out of four and stated: "The pleasures of this great play are so many and so strong that this frequently ordinary rendering of it on film leaves its power virtually undiminished."

Charles Champlin of the Los Angeles Times wrote: "'No play is too long that holds the interest of its audience,' Eugene O'Neill once told an interviewer ... Even with editing, John Frankenheimer's filmed version of the play runs four hours plus two intermissions. But O'Neill was right and the film, like the play, holds its commanding grip on the viewer over the whole distance."

Pauline Kael of The New Yorker wrote that the play "has been given a straightforward, faithful production in handsome dark-toned color" that "Frankenheimer directed fluently and unobtrusively, without destroying the conventions of the play."

The film holds a score of 89% on Rotten Tomatoes based on nine reviews.

Awards
Robert Ryan won a Kansas City Film Critics Circle Award for Best Supporting Actor, National Board of Review Award for Best Actor and a Special Award from the National Society of Film Critics for his performance as Larry Slade.

See also
 List of American films of 1973
 The Nightman Cometh

References

Further reading
 Extensive unsigned notes discuss the long history of this production.

External links 
 
 
 
 Movie of the Week: "The Iceman Cometh" Review via YouTube

1973 films
Films directed by John Frankenheimer
Films produced by Ely Landau
1970s historical drama films
American historical drama films
American films based on plays
Films based on works by Eugene O'Neill
Films set in 1912
1973 drama films
1970s English-language films
1970s American films